The Parsons Katy Hospital, located at 400 Katy Ave. in Parsons, Kansas, was built during 1921–1922.  It was listed on the National Register of Historic Places in 2008.

It was designed by Dallas, Texas architects Robertson and Griesenbeck.  It was built at contract cost of $225,000 by H. Barbour.

It was deemed significant as "an example of a 1920s hospital. The building retains a high degree of integrity and interprets its unique role in the history of Parsons, Kansas."

References

Hospital buildings on the National Register of Historic Places in Kansas
Colonial Revival architecture in Kansas
Hospital buildings completed in 1922
Labette County, Kansas
Hospitals in Kansas